Onikişubat is a district and second level municipality in Kahramanmaraş Province, Turkey. According to Law No 6360, any Turkish province with a population of more than 750,000 is classed as a metropolitan municipality, and the districts within the metropolitan municipalities will be second-level municipalities. The law also creates new districts within the provinces in addition to present districts. These changes will be effective by the local elections in 2014.

Thus after 2014 the present Kahramanmaraş central district was split into two. The western part was named Onikişubat and the name Kahramanmaraş will be reserved for the metropolitan municipality. ("Onikişubat" or 12 February refers to the date of recovery of Kahramanmaraş during the Turkish War of Independence in 1920.)

Rural area
There are 10 towns and 71 villages in the rural area of the district. Now their official status became "neighborhood of Onikişubat".

References

Districts of Kahramanmaraş Province
Kahramanmaraş